Amalda danilai is a species of sea snail, a marine gastropod mollusk in the family Ancillariidae.

Description

Distribution
First noted in 1996, at the Saya de Malha Bank, Western Indo-Pacific realm.

References

danilai
Gastropods described in 1996